NeoFinder is an application for Apple's Mac OS X developed by Norbert M. Doerner since 1995. It was formerly known as CDFinder.

The software is a digital asset management utility,  which offers a wide variety of music, photo, video, and other meta data, including thumbnails and XMP (Adobes Extensible Metadata Platform), that is being read while cataloging a disk or data folder, and has many workflow integrations, such as with Roxio Toast, FileMaker, or Adobe Bridge.

NeoFinder also supports cataloging of geotagged photos, a geo search, and can add GPS tags to photos.

NeoFinder is available as demoware, which lets you to catalog 25 disks, but use all other features as long as you want.

There is also a version available for Windows, since 2000, called abeMeda, formerly known as CDWinder. abeMeda is developed by Andreas H. Becherer. abeMeda uses the same catalog data format and offering the same functionality as NeoFinder.

References

"Geosavvy search on the Mac: CDFinder 5.1, GeoSpotlight", Ogle Earth Blog, March 5, 2008
" CDWinder/Finder 5.1 als Bilddatenbank", digitalkamera.de, February 2, 2008
"Software Review :: CDFinder 5", mac recon Blog, March 7, 2008
"CDFinder in the Mac geotagging workflow", bioneural.net Blog, March 24, 2008
"CDFinder - The Search Is Over", M.A.C.S. (Macintosh Asheville Computer Society), October 25, 2005
"Disk Catalogers", About This Particular Macintosh, October 2005
"CDFinder Product Review", MacUser Magazine, June 2000
"CDFinder Product Review", AppleLust.com, August 2004

External links

MacOS-only software
Cross-platform software